George Brown was the British Governor of Bombay from 11 August 1811 to 12 August 1812, during the period of the Honourable East India Company's rule in India. He succeeded Jonathan Duncan in the post and was replaced by Evan Nepean.

References 

18th-century births
19th-century deaths
Governors of Bombay